West Branch Township is a civil township of Ogemaw County in the U.S. state of Michigan. The population was 2,593 at the 2010 census. The city of West Branch is mostly surrounded by the township, but the two are administered autonomously.

Communities
The community contained its own post office from 1877–1911.

Geography

Demographics
At the 2000 census, there were 2,628 people, 978 households and 730 families residing in the township. The racial make-up of the township was 98.48% White, 0.15% African American, 0.23% Native American, 0.15% Asian, 0.08% from other races and 0.91% from two or more races. Hispanic or Latino of any race were 0.80% of the population.

There were 978 households, of which 32.5% had children under the age of 18 living with them, 62.8% were married couples living together, 7.7% had a female householder with no husband present and 25.3% were non-families. 22.1% of all households were made up of individuals, and 9.7% had someone living alone who was 65 years of age or older. The average household size was 2.59 and the average family size was 3.01.

26.2% of the population were under the age of 18, 6.3% from 18 to 24, 25.3% from 25 to 44, 24.3% from 45 to 64 and 17.8% were 65 years of age or older. The median age was 40 years. For every 100 females, there were 95.2 males. For every 100 females age 18 and over, there were 91.0 males.

The median household income was $38,182 and the median family income was $41,458. Males had a median income of $35,919 vand females $20,313. The per capita income was $17,503. About 7.7% of families and 9.6% of the population were below the poverty line, including 15.1% of those under age 18 and 5.5% of those age 65 or over.

References

Townships in Ogemaw County, Michigan
Townships in Michigan